Laillé is a commune in the Ille-et-Vilaine department in Brittany in northwestern France.

Laillé joined the intercommunality Rennes Métropole on 1 July 2012.

Population
Inhabitants of Laillé are called Lailléens in French.

See also
Communes of the Ille-et-Vilaine department

References

External links

Mayors of Ille-et-Vilaine Association 

Communes of Ille-et-Vilaine